Santi Maria e Gallicano is a Roman Catholic church in Rome, in the district of Trastevere, along via di S. Gallicano, 2.

This is the church attached to the hospital with the same name, built between 1726 at 1729 by Benedict XIII through architect Filippo Raguzzini, who also designed the hospital, built for treating those with skin disease.

A plaque outside commemorates a 1925 restoration, while an inscription above the portal commemorates the hospital. The interior is a Greek cross with four apses. There are paintings by Marco Benefial.

Catholic liturgy does not occur inside.

Bibliography 

 Mariano Armellini, Le chiese di Roma dal secolo IV al XIX, Roma 1891
 C. Rendina, Le Chiese di Roma, Newton & Compton Editori, Milano 2000, p. 114–115
 G. Carpaneto, Rione XIII Trastevere, in AA.VV, I rioni di Roma, Newton & Compton Editori, Milano 2000, Vol. III, pp. 831–923

Churches in Rome
Churches completed in 1729
Roman Catholic churches in Rome